Abel William Stensrud (born 23 May 2002) is a Norwegian footballer who plays as a forward for Odd.

Club career
Stensrud played youth football at Hasle-Løren and Skeid. In October 2020, he made his senior debut for Skeid in the Norwegian Second Division. After scoring 22 goals in 23 games in 2021, he signed a two-year contract with Odd in January 2022. On 10 April 2022, he made his Eliteserien debut in a 1–0 loss against Rosenborg.

International career
In March 2022, he made his international debut for the Norway under-20 national team.

Career statistics

References

External links
 
 

2002 births
Living people
Footballers from Oslo
Association football forwards
Norwegian footballers
Norway youth international footballers
Skeid Fotball players
Odds BK players
Norwegian Second Division players
Eliteserien players